A short beer was a serving size of beer once common in New York City, being a reduced portion of beer for a reduced price. Writer David McAninch reflected on the past tradition for The New York Times:

Short beer, in Britain (also known as small beer), was used to describe a beer brewed for a short period of time to kill off bugs in it so making it safe to drink, as the water was often unhealthy.

In popular culture
In the film A Day at the Races (1937) starring the Marx Bros., Dr. Hugo Z. Hackenbush (Groucho Marx) asks his dinner companion Flo, (Esther Muir) if she would care for a short beer.

The 1939 Merrie Melodies feature A Day at the Zoo features a parrot who in response to being offered a cracker says "nah, gimme a short beer."

The popular radio program “Fibber McGee and Molly” featured a character, Horatio K. Boomer (voiced by Bill Thomson), who would often have in his pocket a bill (unpaid, because he was a cheapskate and a con man) for a short beer.

In the film Balboa , Rocky asks for a Short Beer

References

Beer glassware
Alcohol measurement
Cultural history of New York City